The Randal House is a historic mansion in Hammond, Louisiana, U.S.. It has been listed on the National Register of Historic Places since February 19, 2008.

References

Houses on the National Register of Historic Places in Louisiana
Italianate architecture in Louisiana
Houses completed in 1896
National Register of Historic Places in Tangipahoa Parish, Louisiana